The 2019–20 Metro Atlantic Athletic Conference (MAAC) men's basketball season began with practices in October 2019, followed by the start of the 2019–20 NCAA Division I men's basketball season on November 1st. Conference play started in January and concluded March 11, 2020 due to the COVID-19 pandemic. This season was the 39th season of MAAC basketball.

In a most unpredictable season, all 11 teams had an equal shot at being the top team in the MAAC, but at the end, only one could emerge. The regular season crown came down to the final day. Siena, picked sixth, controlled their own destiny, beat Monmouth and clinched their first outright MAAC regular season championship in almost a decade. Siena would put the game away early and cruise to an 86–72 victory, clinching the MAAC regular season championship and the #1 seed in the 2020 MAAC tournament. Upstart Saint Peter's, picked ninth, would finish one game behind Siena, so close to their first conference championship since 1987. Iona, who was the preseason favorite in the MAAC, was without their coach Tim Cluess, who missed the entire 2019–20 season with an undisclosed illness, and finished in sixth place. It was their lowest finish in the standings since finishing seventh in 2008–2009.

The 2020 MAAC tournament was held on March 10 and March 11 at the Jim Whelan Boardwalk Hall in Atlantic City, New Jersey. The 2020 MAAC Basketball Championship moved to the historic Boardwalk Hall for the first time in MAAC history. However, after the two quarterfinal games on March 11, the other two quarterfinal games, semifinals and finals were cancelled amid the COVID-19 pandemic. Siena, who was the #1 seed, and who had won their quarterfinal game, would have been the MAAC's automatic bid to the NCAA tournament should it have been held. On March 12, the tournament, as well as all other NCAA championships for the remainder of the academic season, were cancelled due to the COVID-19 pandemic. It was the first time the tournament had been cancelled since its creation in 1939.

Head Coaches

Coaching changes 
On March 11, 2019, Fairfield head coach Sydney Johnson was fired. He finished at Fairfield with an eight-year record of 116–147. On April 3, Rutgers assistant Jay Young was announced as Johnson's replacement.

On March 11, 2019, Niagara head coach Chris Casey was fired. He finished at Niagara with a six-year record of 64–129. On March 28, 2019, Niagara hired Patrick Beilein as their new head coach. On October 24, it was announced that Beilein would be stepping down from his job, citing personal reasons. That same day, assistant coach Greg Paulus was announced as interim head coach.

On March 21, 2019, it was announced that Siena head coach Jamion Christian would be accepting the head coaching position at George Washington. On March 25, it was announced that assistant coach Carmen Maciariello would be named as Christian's successor.

Coaches 

Notes: 
 All records, appearances, titles, etc. are from time with current school only. 
 Year at school includes 2019–20 season.
 Overall and MAAC records are from time at current school and are before the beginning of the season.
 Previous jobs are head coaching jobs unless otherwise noted.

Preseason

Preseason Coaches Poll

() first place votes

Preseason All-MAAC teams

† denotes unanimous selection

Preseason Player of the Year

MAAC Regular Season

Conference Matrix
This table summarizes the final head-to-head results between teams in conference play during the regular season.

Player of the week
Throughout the regular season, the Metro Atlantic Athletic Conference offices named player(s) of the week and rookie(s) of the week.

Records against other conferences
2019–20 records against non-conference foes. Records shown for regular season only.

Postseason

MAAC Tournament

 2020 Metro Atlantic Athletic Conference Basketball Tournament, Jim Whelan Boardwalk Hall, Atlantic City, New Jersey
 Tournament was canceled before the games of March 12 began due to COVID-19.

* denotes number of overtimes

NCAA Tournament

Honors and awards

MAAC Awards

† denotes unanimous selection

2019–20 Season final statistic leaders

References

External links
MAAC website